Benvenuta is a 1983 Belgian-French-Italian romantic drama film written and directed by André Delvaux. It is based on the Suzanne Lilar's novel La Confession anonyme.

Cast 
 Fanny Ardant - Benvenuta
 Vittorio Gassman - Livio Carpi
 Françoise Fabian - Jeanne
 Mathieu Carrière - François
 Claire Wauthion - Inge
 Philippe Geluck - Father
 Anne Chappuis - Mother
 Armando Marra - Le chanteur
 Renato Scarpa - The Journalist 
 Franco Trevisi - Le policier

References

External links

1983 films
Belgian romantic drama films
French romantic drama films
Italian romantic drama films
Films directed by André Delvaux
Films scored by Frédéric Devreese
1983 romantic drama films
1980s French films
1980s Italian films